Purine analogues are antimetabolites that mimic the structure of metabolic purines.

Examples
Nucleobase analogues
Thiopurines such as thioguanine are used to treat acute leukemias and remissions in acute granulocytic leukemias.
Azathioprine is the main immunosuppressive cytotoxic substance. A prodrug, it is widely used in transplantation to control rejection reactions. It is nonenzymatically cleaved to mercaptopurine, a purine analogue that inhibits DNA synthesis. By preventing the clonal expansion of lymphocytes in the induction phase of the immune response, it affects both cell immunity and humoral immunity. It also successfully suppresses autoimmunity.
Mercaptopurine
Thioguanine
Nucleoside analogues
Clofarabine
Pentostatin and cladribine are adenosine analogs that are used primarily to treat hairy cell leukemia.
Nucleotide analogues
Fludarabine inhibits multiple DNA polymerases, DNA primase, and DNA ligase I, and is S phase-specific (since these enzymes are highly active during DNA replication).

Medical uses
Purine antimetabolites are commonly used to treat cancer by interfering with DNA replication.

References

Antimetabolites